
Gmina Kórnik (Kórnik Commune) is an urban-rural gmina (administrative district) in Poznań County, Greater Poland Voivodeship, in west-central Poland.

Villages
Apart from the town of Kórnik, Gmina Kórnik contains the villages and settlements of:

BiernatkiBłażejewkoBłażejewoBorówiecCzmońCzmoniecCzołowoDachowaDębiecDworzyska

DziećmierowoGądkiJaryszkiKamionkiKonarskieKoninkoMościenicaPierzchnoPrusinowo

RobakowoRunowoSkrzynkiŚwiątniczkiSzczodrzykowoSzczytnikiTrzykolne MłynyŻernikiRadzewo

Neighbouring gminas
Gmina Kórnik is bordered by the city of Poznań and by the gminas of Kleszczewo, Mosina, Śrem, Środa Wielkopolska and Zaniemyśl.

References
Polish official population figures 2006

Kornik
Poznań County